Maria Elena Bottazzi (born 1966 in Genoa) is a Honduran and Italian-born naturalized American microbiologist, currently Associate Dean of the National School of Tropical Medicine at Baylor College of Medicine, as well as Distinguished Professor of Biology at Baylor University, Waco, Texas. She is editor-in-chief of Springer's Current Tropical Medicine Reports. She and Peter Hotez led the team that designed COVID-19 vaccine Corbevax.

Early life and education
The daughter of a Honduran diplomat, Bottazzi was born in Italy; she moved to Honduras when she was eight. She studied microbiology and clinical chemistry as an undergraduate at the National Autonomous University of Honduras (1989), then earned a doctorate in molecular immunology and experimental pathology from the University of Florida in 1995. She completed post-doctoral work in cellular biology at the University of Miami (1998) and the University of Pennsylvania (2001).

Career
Bottazzi is Associate Dean of the National School of Tropical Medicine at Baylor College of Medicine, and Distinguished Professor of Biology at Baylor University, Waco, Texas.

Along with Peter Hotez, Bottazzi runs the Texas Children's Hospital Center for Vaccine Development. The center develops vaccines for neglected tropical diseases and other emerging and infectious diseases. One of these vaccines was a SARS-CoV vaccine that was ready for human trials in 2016, but at the time the team could find no one interested in funding it. With the onset of the COVID-19 pandemic, Bottazzi and Hotez secured funding to develop Corbevax, a COVID-19 vaccine their group offered without taking a licensing fee for the intellectual property, in hopes of lowering costs of vaccination. It also employs recombinant protein technology, used in vaccines since the 1980s (like the Hepatitis B vaccine), with hopes this would be easier for manufacturers to produce than the newer mRNA technology. In December 2021, Corbevax received emergency use authorization from India, which preordered 300 million doses.

In 2017 Bottazzi received the Orden Gran Cruz Placa de Oro.

She is editor in chief of Springer's Current Tropical Medicine Reports.

References

21st-century American biologists
Women microbiologists
Baylor University faculty
Living people
University of Florida alumni
American microbiologists
American women biologists
Place of birth missing (living people)
American women academics
Baylor College of Medicine faculty
21st-century American women scientists
1966 births